David George Doughty (born 9 November 1937) played first-class cricket for Somerset in 17 matches in the 1963 and 1964 seasons. He also appeared in one one-day match in the Gillette Cup.

Biography 
born 9 November 1937 at Chiswick, Middlesex, Doughty was a lower-order left-handed batsman and a slow left-arm orthodox spin bowler. He played second eleven cricket for Middlesex, Surrey and Leicestershire between 1959 and 1961, often batting quite high in the order. But it was as a left-arm spinner that he was recommended to Somerset by Arthur Wellard. He played in 16 first-class matches for the county in the successful 1963 season, when Somerset finished third in the County Championship, equalling the highest-ever placing to that point.

In those 16 matches, Doughty took 35 wickets at the low average of 18.14 runs per wicket. His most successful match came against Derbyshire at Weston-super-Mare when he took six wickets for 58 runs in the first innings and followed that with five for 44 in the second for match figures of 11 for 102. These were the only occasions on which he took five wickets in an innings, and he had lost his place in the team by the end of the season. In 1964, he made only a single first-class appearance, and though it brought his highest first-class score, 22, it did not bring any wickets, and he did not play first-class cricket again.

Doughty's single List A appearance produced a curiosity. Playing in Somerset's first-ever one-day match in the inaugural Gillette Cup against Glamorgan in 1963, he took one wicket and then came in to bat at No 10 with Somerset at 121 for eight, chasing a total of 207. Doughty scored 20 and put on 75 for the ninth wicket with Brian Langford, who made 56. In 2009, the stand was still Somerset's ninth-wicket List A cricket record and the oldest surviving List A record.

References

1937 births
Living people
English cricketers
Somerset cricketers